Tirsuli is a Himalayan mountain peak in the 
Pithoragarh district of Uttarakhand, India. It is part of the complex of mountains, including Tirsuli West, Hardeol, Dunagiri, Changabang, and Kalanka, which make up the northeast wall of the Nanda Devi Sanctuary, in the Garhwal Himalaya. It rises at the northern end of the Johar Valley, which drains into the Gori Ganga. This peak should not be confused with nearby Trisul, which is on the southwest side of the Sanctuary.

In 1939, a serious attempt on this peak by the successful Polish expedition to Nanda Devi East was abandoned after a night avalanche buried leader Adam Karpinski and climber Stefan Bernadzikiewicz at Camp 3. Indian team led by Mohan Singh Kohli from Indian Mountaineering Foundation, under Ministry of Defence, Government of India tried an unsuccessful attempt to the peak in 1964. The peak was scaled for the first time on 9 October 1966 by another Indian team led by Chanchal Kumar Mitra & organised for the 2nd. time by Himalayan Association of calcutta. Nirapada Mallik (Dy.leader), Shyamal Chakrabarty, Nima Tashi ( former Dy.Director of training at The HMI Darjeeling) and Dorji sherpa  were the summitters. Other members of the team were Manik Banerjee, K.K.Khanna, Marcopolo Srimal, Dr. Jungpangi from Geological Survey of India, Dr.Amitava Sen(M.O), Pinaki Sinha and Sailesh Chakraborty. The expedition was organised by the Himalayan Association, Kolkata.

See also
 List of mountains in India

References

Mountains of Uttarakhand
Geography of Pithoragarh district
Seven-thousanders of the Himalayas